The longissimus is the muscle lateral to the semispinalis muscles. It is the longest subdivision of the erector spinae muscles that extends forward into the transverse processes of the posterior cervical vertebrae.

Structure

Longissimus thoracis et lumborum
The longissimus thoracis et lumborum is the intermediate and largest of the continuations of the erector spinae.

In the lumbar region (longissimus lumborum), where it is as yet blended with the iliocostalis, some of its fibers are attached to the whole length of the posterior surfaces of the transverse processes and the accessory processes of the lumbar vertebrae, and to the anterior layer of the lumbodorsal fascia.

In the thoracic region (longissimus thoracis), it is inserted, by rounded tendons, into the tips of the transverse processes of all the thoracic vertebrae, and by fleshy processes into the lower nine or ten ribs between their tubercles and angles.

Longissimus cervicis
The longissimus cervicis (transversalis cervicis), situated medial to the longissimus thoracis, arises by long, thin tendons from the summits of the transverse processes of thoracic vertebræ 1–5, and is inserted by similar tendons into the posterior tubercles of the transverse processes of cervical vertebrae 2–6.

Longissimus capitis
The longissimus capitis (trachelomastoid muscle) lies medial to the longissimus cervicis, between it and the semispinalis capitis.

It arises by tendons from the transverse processes of the upper four or five thoracic vertebrae, and the articular processes of the lower three or four cervical vertebrae, and is inserted into the posterior margin of the mastoid process, beneath the splenius capitis and sternocleidomastoid.

It is almost always crossed by a tendinous intersection near its insertion.

See also

 Spinalis

References

External links
  – "Intrinsic muscles of the back."
 
 Dissection at ithaca.edu

Muscles of the torso